Marouf is a given name. Notable people with the name include:

Marouf al-Bakhit (born 1947), Jordanian politician
Marouf Nodeyi (1753–1838), Kurdish poet and scholar
Marouf Tchakei (born 1995), Togolese footballer

See also
Marouf (surname)